My Early Life, also known in the USA as A Roving Commission: My Early Life, is a 1930 book by Winston Churchill. It is an autobiography from his birth in 1874 to around 1902. The book closes with mention of his marriage in 1908, stating that he lived happily ever after.

Synopsis
The book begins by describing his childhood and schooldays, and provides context for the earlier published accounts of events in his early life. He describes his large collection of toy soldiers, his usually unsuccessful experiences in school, and how his family decided his path in life was to join the army as an officer.

He describes how he became proficient in writing and speaking English, as he has three terms of a course under an excellent teacher of English; had he been a more successful student by the standards of schools of his youth, he would have learned Latin and Greek instead. That part of his education proved fruitful when he began to write for newspapers and speak in public, gaining praise for his efforts. He was saddened by the early death of his father, not having the opportunity to have an adult relationship with him. Otherwise, his characteristic optimism carries him through every experience of his life, allowing him to see events that at first seemed a misfortune as changing his path in life to one with a later success.

Harrow School prepared him to attend Sandhurst and become an officer in the army, specifically in a cavalry unit. He was an avid polo player in his years as an army officer. Once out of formal schooling, he was eager for experiences, taking every opportunity to be where the action was. He was an observer in Cuba as Spain fought the rebels there and that same itch for experience brought him to the battles at the frontier of India (an area now in Pakistan), and brought him to South Africa.

He describes his program to broaden his education as an officer in India with much spare time on his hands, especially in the heat of midday. His mother shipped books to him, and he read widely in history, philosophy, and ethics, at the moment when he was ready to absorb the information and keep it in his memory. He describes the effect of one incident in travelling by ship to his first posting in India that dislocated his shoulder, an injury that affected him the rest of his life, limiting his activity in sports and a few times in battle. One example of this was his reliance on a pistol instead of his cavalry sword in battle, with at least one situation where his injured shoulder would have led to him being a casualty instead of the victor.

He needed to support himself financially and learned he could earn money as a reporter of the scenes of war he witnessed, as a soldier and after he left the army. He wrote books on the major military campaigns, earning money from the sales. His first attempt to stand for election as a member of parliament failed; events in South Africa drew him there, gaining him a reputation that let him win a seat once he returned to England at age 26. His dramatic escape from being a prisoner of war gained him fame, and his subsequent newspaper accounts of later battles secured his generally favorable reputation.

A significant portion of the book covers his experiences in the Second Boer War of 1899-1902, which he had earlier described in London to Ladysmith via Pretoria (1900) and Ian Hamilton's March (1900). It also includes descriptions of other campaigns he had previously written about: The River War (1899), concerning the reconquest of Sudan, and The Story of the Malakand Field Force (1898) in today's Pakistan.

He wrote this autobiography in his mid 50s, after the Great War and before anyone knew there would be a Second World War. His perspective from his experience of war in the 20th century allowed him to see his early life as part of a vanished era in warfare, and in the social structure of life in England.

Background

The introduction notes that Churchill endeavoured to write the book from his point of view at the time of the events, but it contains different commentaries on the events described in the other books, many of which were originally written as contemporary newspaper columns. From his perspective of writing in 1930, he notes that he has 'drawn a picture of a vanished age'. The book also notes an observation by the French ambassador to Britain between 1900 and 1920, that during his time, a silent revolution had occurred, which totally replaced the ruling class of Britain.

The book was published after the Conservative Party lost the 1929 election and consequently Churchill ceased to be a member of the government. He occupied himself, instead, writing a number of books, which together with public speaking was his chief source of income throughout his life. However, most of My Early Life was written during the parliamentary recess in the summer of 1928. He wrote to Stanley Baldwin, "I have had a delightful month - building a cottage and dictating a book: 200 bricks and 2000 words per day."

The first English edition published by Thornton Butterworth in October 1930 sold 11,200 copies, and the American edition published by Charles Scribner's Sons sold 6,600.  Scribner's titled the book by the name of its UK subtitle, A Roving Commission.

The book includes an observation made upon the death of his nanny.  He wrote, "She had been my dearest and most intimate friend during the whole of the twenty years I had lived."

Book

 1. Childhood Life 
 2. Harrow
 3. Examinations
 4. Sandhurst
 5. The Fourth Hussars
 6. Cuba
 7. Hounslow
 8. India
 9. Education at Bangalore
 10. The Malakand Field Force (in today's Pakistan)
 11. The Mamund Valley
 12. The Tirah Expedition
 13. A Difficulty with Kitchener
 14. The Eve of Omdurman (in today's Sudan)
 15. The Sensations of a Cavalry Charge
 16. I Leave the Army
 17. Oldham
 18. With Buller to the Cape
 19. The Armoured Train (in today's South Africa)
 20. In Durance Vile
 21. I Escape from the Boers-I
 22. I Escape from the Boers-II
 23. Back to the Army
 24. Spion Kop
 25. The Relief of Ladysmith
 26. In the Orange Free State
 27. Johannesburg and Pretoria
 28. The Khaki Election
 29. The House of Commons

Reception
This book has been considered by some to be Churchill’s best book and one of the outstanding works of the 20th century because it was deliberately written to be much shorter than his typical books, with a slight sense of irony and an intention to entertain. It contains a certain level of self-mockery alongside criticism of others he encountered. Unlike some other of his works, it did not seek to prove any particular point.

Film

The 1972 film Young Winston was based on this book.

Publication history
 Thornton Butterworth: London, 1930.
 Charles Scribner's sons: New York, 1930.
 1990.  (paperback)
Eland: London, 2000.

References

External links
 

1930 non-fiction books
Books by Winston Churchill
Eland Books books
Books written by prime ministers of the United Kingdom